Indigofera rothii is a species of plant in the family Fabaceae. It is found only in Ethiopia.

References

rothii
Flora of Ethiopia
Vulnerable plants
Taxonomy articles created by Polbot